
John D. Harris is a computer programmer, hacker and author of several 1980s Atari computer games. His impact on the early years of the video game industry are chronicled in the book Hackers: Heroes of the Computer Revolution.

His love for the Atari 8-bit computers led him to creating several popular games, perhaps most of all Frogger, which by the end of development had been written from scratch, twice. The reason for this is that his entire back catalogue of development tools and libraries he had developed were stolen at a game developer conference at which he was presenting. The delay in writing the game also led to complications between Harris and his employer, Ken Williams (Director of Sierra On-Line).

During John's time at Sierra, he became one of the most influential young developers in America, at 24 years of age he was earning a 6 figure income off the back of royalties for games which Sierra were marketing for him. As time went on, John's increasingly worrying relationship with Sierra began to get worse, the cutting of royalties and the lack of recognition for his work soon became a catalyst which led to him leaving the company to work at Synapse (despite many offers of employment from new startup EA Games).

Works

Atari 8-bit 
 Jawbreaker, Sierra On-Line, 1981
 Frogger, Sierra On-Line, 1982
 Mouskattack
 Maneuvering
 Bankster
 MAE

Atari 2600 
 Jawbreaker, Tiger Vision

AmigaDE 
 Gobbler
 Solitaire

Employment 
 Pulsar Interactive Corp., 1997–2003
 Tachyon Studios, Inc.
 Atari
 Synapse
 Sierra On-Line

References 
 Interview with John Harris regarding Hackers and his career and views on game development
 Interview with John Harris regarding developing for AmigaDE, July 2002

Year of birth missing (living people)
Living people
American computer programmers
American video game designers
American video game programmers